Lal Singh is an Indian politician. He is the Former Finance Minister of Punjab. He was president of Punjab Pradesh Congress Committee. He is a former member of Punjab Legislative Assembly and represents Sanour.

Family
His father's name is Sunder Singh.

Political career
Lal singh first became a member of Punjab Legislative Assembly on the Congress ticket from Dakala in 1977 Since then he has represented Dakala 5 times until 2012, when Dakala underwent boundary delimitation. In 1985 and 1997 elections he lost to Shiromani Akali Dal candidates Prem Singh Chandumajra and Harmail Singh respectively.
In 2012 elections, Singh successfully contested from Sanour.

References

Living people
Punjab, India MLAs 2007–2012
Punjab, India MLAs 2012–2017
Year of birth missing (living people)
Place of birth missing (living people)
Punjab, India MLAs 2002–2007
Punjab, India MLAs 1977–1980
Punjab, India MLAs 1980–1985
Punjab, India MLAs 1992–1997
Indian National Congress politicians
People from Patiala district